Mirel Matei Rădoi (born 22 March 1981) is a Romanian professional football manager and former player. He is the current manager of Saudi Arabian club Al-Tai.

A defensive midfielder or a centre-back, Rădoi began his playing career at Extensiv Craiova in 1999, before signing for Steaua București one year later. Following eight-and-a-half seasons in the capital, he spent his later career with Al-Hilal, Al-Ain, Al-Ahli and Al-Arabi. Internationally, Rădoi was capped 68 times by Romania, which he represented at the UEFA Euro 2008.

Rădoi's first stint as a head coach was Steaua București in 2015, where he stayed for six months. Three years later, he was appointed at the helm of the Romania under-21 national team, which he led to the semi-finals of the 2019 UEFA European Championship. This resulted in his promotion to the senior team in November 2019, but left after two years with less success.

Playing career

Extensiv Craiova
Rădoi started to play football at the age of eight, first as a goalkeeper and then as a defender. He started his youth career at Turnu Severin and there he was spotted by Sorin Cârțu, the coach of Extensiv Craiova, who was so impressed by him that he purchased Rădoi in 1999, financing the transfer with his own money. Rădoi made his professional debut in 1999, in a defeat against Dinamo București on 4 March 2000.  he left the club.

Steaua București
Just one year later, in the summer of 2000, Rădoi joined Steaua București for a fee of €110,000. Describing his first day at Steaua, he said, "It was like a positive shock for me. Suddenly I was in the same place with players like Iulian Miu, Marius Baciu and Miodrag Belodedici, players I saw on TV. It was like a dream."

His coach at Steaua was Victor Pițurcă, the former Romania national team coach, who promoted him to the Steaua first team. He then became one of Steaua's most important players. In his first match for the club, a 4–3 victory over FCM Bacău at the Ghencea football stadium, Rădoi scored the equalizer in the ninth minute after Cătălin Cursaru had opened the scoring for Bacău less than a minute before.

Steaua would go on to win the championship of the Romanian league that year, as well as the Supercupa României against rivals Dinamo.

In 2005, Rădoi won a second championship title; and in 2006, yet another: his third. On 24 February 2005, he won an important match in the UEFA Cup against holder Valencia. In 2006 Rădoi captained the team in the UEFA Cup semi-final against Middlesbrough which Steaua lost 4–3 on aggregate.

In the summer of 2006, a rumour circulated that Rădoi would sign for Premier League club Portsmouth as soon as the transfer window opened in England, with the transfer fee estimated at around £11 million. The transfer did not materialize, however, and many speculated that the £11 million offer was no more than a ploy to jack up the player's potential transfer value before a move elsewhere. In the end, FCSB's owner Gigi Becali stated that he would not be selling Rădoi after all.

Due to injury, he only played his first official game in the 2006–07 season on 12 November, a 6–0 victory against Național București.

Later career
In January 2009, Rădoi signed a three-year contract with Saudi Arabian club Al-Hilal which earned him €1.4 million annually. The transfer fee FCSB received was in the region of €6 million. Rădoi made his debut for Al-Hilal in the local derby against Al-Nassr, which Al-Hilal won 2–0 with Rădoi scoring the second goal.

In his sixth game with the club, he won the Prince's Cup, defeating Al-Shabab in the final. Nicknamed "The Warrior" by his fans in Saudi Arabia, he was voted Saudi Professional League Player of the Year in 2010. They even made a complete book about his career and has been published online with official website MRadoi.com. Rădoi spent three years at the club, becoming a legend, and the team's captain, before he was reunited with ex-Al-Hilal and Steaua manager Cosmin Olăroiu at Al Ain.

In June 2011, Rădoi was transferred to Al Ain for a fee of €4.2 million. He signed a two-year deal worth €2.5 million annually.

International

Rădoi has been capped 67 times for the Romania, scoring two goals. In 2005, Romanian team manager Victor Pițurcă suspended him for leaving training camp without permission before matches against the Netherlands and Armenia. Coach Pițurcă recalled him in February 2006 for a friendly tournament in Cyprus after Rădoi apologised for his behaviour.

Although he was included in Romania's squad for UEFA Euro 2008, he suffered an eye injury and broken nose during the second group game against Italy after clashing heads with team-mate Răzvan Raț, who emerged unscathed. Rădoi played no further part in the tournament. After a confrontation with Răzvan Lucescu in 2010, Radoi declared that he would retire from the national team.

Coaching career
Rădoi became the head coach of the Romania national team after resignation of Cosmin Contra in November 2019.

On 22 January 2023, Rădoi was appointed as manager of Saudi Pro League club Al-Tai.

Career statistics

Club
Correct as of 1 June 2015

International

International goals

Managerial

Honours

Player
Steaua București
Divizia A: 2000–01, 2004–05, 2005–06
Supercupa României: 2001, 2006

Al-Hilal
Saudi Professional League: 2009–10, 2010–11
Crown Prince Cup: 2008–09, 2009–10, 2010–11

Al-Ahli
UAE Pro-League: 2011–12, 2012–13
UAE Super Cup: 2012
UAE President's Cup: 2013–14

Individual
Gazeta Sporturilor Romanian Footballer of the Year runner-up: 2005
Saudi Professional League Player of the Year: 2010

References

External links

1981 births
Living people
People from Drobeta-Turnu Severin
Romanian footballers
Romania international footballers
Romanian expatriate footballers
FC Drobeta-Turnu Severin players
FC Steaua București players
Association football fullbacks
UEFA Euro 2008 players
Liga I players
Liga II players
Saudi Professional League players
UAE Pro League players
Qatar Stars League players
Al Hilal SFC players
Al Ain FC players
Al Ahli Club (Dubai) players
Al-Arabi SC (Qatar) players
Expatriate footballers in Saudi Arabia
Expatriate footballers in the United Arab Emirates
Expatriate footballers in Qatar
Romanian football managers
Liga I managers
Saudi Professional League managers
FC Steaua București managers
CS Universitatea Craiova managers
Al-Ta'ee managers
Romania national football team managers
Romanian expatriate sportspeople in Saudi Arabia
Romanian expatriate sportspeople in the United Arab Emirates
Romanian expatriate sportspeople in Qatar
Expatriate football managers in Saudi Arabia